Martin Rowe (born 24 June 1971) is a British and Manx rally driver who won the British Rally Championship in 1998, the British Formula Rally Championship in 2001, Production World Rally Championship in 2003 and the Chinese Rally Championship in 2006.

Alongside his title in the British Rally Championship in 1998, Rowe took the Formula Rally Championship in 2001 driving a Ford Puma S1600 after original champion, Justin Dale, his co-driver Andrew Bargery, and winning manufacturer Peugeot were excluded due to a homologation issue in the final round which affected both Proton and Peugeot. With Dale later losing his appeal, Rowe was awarded the drivers title and Chris Wood the co-drivers title.

In 1998 and 2003 Rowe was named as the National Rally Driver of the Year.

References

1971 births
World Rally Championship drivers
British rally drivers
Living people
Manx racing drivers